Descriptive ethics, also known as comparative ethics, is the study of people's beliefs about morality. It contrasts with prescriptive or normative ethics, which is the study of ethical theories that prescribe how people ought to act, and with meta-ethics, which is the study of what ethical terms and theories actually refer to. The following examples of questions that might be considered in each field illustrate the differences between the fields:
Descriptive ethics: What do people think is right?
Meta-ethics: What does "right" even mean?
Normative (prescriptive) ethics: How should people act?
Applied ethics: How do we take moral knowledge and put it into practice?

What is descriptive ethics?
Descriptive ethics is a form of empirical research into the attitudes of individuals or groups of people. In other words, this is the division of philosophical or general ethics that involves the observation of the moral decision-making process with the goal of describing the phenomenon. Those working on descriptive ethics aim to uncover people's beliefs about such things as values, which actions are right and wrong, and which characteristics of moral agents are virtuous. Research into descriptive ethics may also investigate people's ethical ideals or what actions societies reward or punish in law or politics. What ought to be noted is that culture is generational and not static. Therefore, a new generation will come with its own set of morals and that qualifies to be their ethics. Descriptive ethics will hence try to oversee whether ethics still holds its place.

Because descriptive ethics involves empirical investigation, it is a field that is usually investigated by those working in the fields of evolutionary biology, psychology, sociology or anthropology. Information that comes from descriptive ethics is, however, also used in philosophical arguments.

Value theory can be either normative or descriptive but is usually descriptive.

Lawrence Kohlberg: An example of descriptive ethics
Lawrence Kohlberg is one example of a psychologist working on descriptive ethics. In one study, for example, Kohlberg questioned a group of boys about what would be a right or wrong action for a man facing a moral dilemma (specifically, the Heinz dilemma): should he steal a drug to save his wife, or refrain from theft even though that would lead to his wife's death?
Kohlberg's concern was not which choice the boys made, but the moral reasoning that lay behind their decisions. After carrying out a number of related studies, Kohlberg devised a theory about the development of human moral reasoning that was intended to reflect the moral reasoning actually carried out by the participants in his research. Kohlberg's research can be classed as descriptive ethics to the extent that he describes human beings' actual moral development. If, in contrast, he had aimed to describe how humans ought to develop morally, his theory would have involved prescriptive ethics.

References

Further reading
 
 Coleman, Stephen Edwin, "DIGITAL PHOTO MANIPULATION: A DESCRIPTIVE ANALYSIS OF CODES OF ETHICS AND ETHICAL DECISIONS OF PHOTO EDITORS" (2007). Dissertations. 1304. https://aquila.usm.edu/dissertations/1304

See also
 Experimental philosophy
 List of ethics topics
 Meta-ethics
 Moral reasoning
 Moral psychology

Ethical theories
Moral psychology